The long-nosed Luzon forest mouse (Apomys sacobianus), also known as the Pinatubo volcano mouse is a species of rodent in the family Muridae.
It is found only in the Philippines.
Its natural habitat is subtropical or tropical dry forests.
It is threatened by habitat loss.

Rediscovery
Known only from a single type specimen in a museum collection, a 2021 paper revealed field surveys in 2011 and 2012 found it to be common.

References

Luzon forest mouse, Long nosed
Apomys
Luzon forest mouse, Long nosed
Luzon forest mouse, Long nosed
Luzon forest mouse, Long nosed
Mammals described in 1962
Taxonomy articles created by Polbot